Babies are very young offspring.

Babies may also refer to:

 Babies (Černý), a series of sculptures by Czech artist David Černý
 Babies (film), a 2010 French documentary film by Thomas Balmès
 Babies (TV series), a 2020 American documentary web television series
 "Babies" (song), a 1992 song by British rock group Pulp
 "Babies" (Kyle song), a song by Kyle from the 2018 album Light of Mine
 "Babies" (Natasha Bedingfield song), a 2007 song by Natasha Bedingfield
 The Babies, an American rock band
 The Babies (album), 2011

See also
 
 Babys
 Baby (disambiguation)
 Babes (disambiguation)